Loveday Carlyon is a Cornish nationalist politician.

Originally from Torpoint, Carlyon joined Mebyon Kernow.  She married fellow party member Julyan Holmes, and moved to Liskeard.  She was soon elected to the town council, and became a prominent spokesperson for the organisation, in particular commenting on local food production, as a member of the Cornish Association of Smallholders and Producers.  Elected leader of Mebyon Kernow in 1986, she was successful in campaigning for the retention of Cornish language translations on road signs around Liskeard.  She stood down as party leader in 1989, but remained politically active, and by 2014 was chair of St Keyne parish council.

References

Year of birth missing (living people)
Living people
People from Torpoint
Cornish nationalists
Councillors in Cornwall
Mebyon Kernow politicians
Leaders of political parties in the United Kingdom